World's Greatest Dad is a 2009 American satirical black comedy-drama film written and directed by Bobcat Goldthwait and starring Robin Williams, Daryl Sabara, and Alexie Gilmore. The film was released on July 24, 2009, on video on demand providers before its limited theatrical release on August 21, 2009.

Plot
Lance Clayton is a single father and high school English teacher who dreams of becoming a famous writer, but his previous novels have all been rejected by publishers. His 15-year-old son Kyle is a sex-obsessed, underachieving misanthrope who is a student at the school where Lance teaches an unpopular poetry class. 

Kyle's poor academic performance and vile behavior gain the attention of the school principal, who advises Lance to transfer Kyle to a special-needs school. One night, Lance discovers that Kyle has died in an autoerotic asphyxiation accident in his bedroom. To salvage his son's dignity, Lance stages Kyle's death as a suicide. He hangs Kyle in a closet and posts a fake suicide note on his body.

A classmate later obtains the suicide note from police records and publishes it in the school newspaper. The note strikes a chord with the students and faculty and many students suddenly claim to have been friends with Kyle and are touched by how deep and intelligent he shows himself to be in his writings. Enjoying the attention his writing is finally receiving, Lance decides to write and publish a phony journal that was supposedly written by his son before his death. 

Kyle becomes somewhat of a post-mortem cult phenomenon at the school, and Lance soon begins to receive the adoration that he has always desired. He becomes much more interesting to his girlfriend Claire, a fellow teacher, who had previously shown an interest in their younger colleague Mike. Andrew, Kyle's sole friend, finds Kyle's suicide note and journals highly uncharacteristic based on Kyle's personality when he was alive, but Lance brushes Andrew off when Andrew confronts him.

The journal soon attracts the attention of book publishers and Lance lands a television appearance on a nationally broadcast talk show. The school principal then decides to rename the school library in Kyle's honor. At the library dedication, Lance feels imperative guilt for exploiting his son's death for his own benefit as well as hatred towards those feigning their fondness for Kyle. While giving a speech, Lance decides he can no longer continue the charade and confesses to everyone that Kyle's death was accidental, and that he wrote the suicide note and journal. Predictably, Lance is denounced by the students and faculty, including Claire, and simultaneously finally realizes it is better to be alone than to end up with people who make him feel all alone. 

Despite now being despised by everyone, Lance nevertheless feels reborn and dives naked into the school's swimming pool. Outside, Andrew tells Lance that he knew the truth all along, but nevertheless enjoyed his writing and encourages him to keep writing. The two happily watch a zombie movie at Lance's home with his neighbor Bonnie.

Cast
 Robin Williams as Lance Clayton
 Alexie Gilmore as Claire Reed
 Daryl Sabara as Kyle Clayton
 Evan Martin as Andrew Troutman
 Geoff Pierson as Principal Wyatt Anderson
 Henry Simmons as Mike Lane
 Mitzi McCall as Bonnie McBon
 Jermaine Williams as Jason
 Lorraine Nicholson as Heather Johnson
 Morgan Murphy as Morgan
 Toby Huss as Bert Green
 Tom Kenny as Jerry Klein
 Jill Talley as Make-Up Woman
 Bruce Hornsby as himself
 Krist Novoselic as Newspaper Vendor (cameo)
 Bobcat Goldthwait as Limo Driver (uncredited)

Production
The film was shot in Seattle, Washington, largely at the former F.A. McDonald School in Wallingford. Seattle resident and former Nirvana bassist Krist Novoselic has a wordless cameo while consoling Robin Williams' character at a newspaper stand; Goldthwait had previously opened for Nirvana. Bruce Hornsby appears as himself at the library dedication.

Critical reception
World's Greatest Dad received praise despite tanking at the box office. , it holds an 88% approval rating on Rotten Tomatoes, based on 118 reviews, with an average rating of 6.93/10, with the critical consensus: "World's Greatest Dad is a risky, deadpan, dark comedy that effectively explores the nature of posthumous cults of celebrity." The film also holds a score of 69 out of 100 on Metacritic, based on 24 critics, indicating "generally favorable reviews".

Sandra L. Frey observed the film's portrayal of teen angst, and said that the film also reminds the audience that adults can offer strong angst of their own. 

Devin Faraci called the film "brilliant" and "genius". Paul Fischer named it as one of the best films of the year. Ben Lyons and Ben Mankiewicz both gave the film favorable reviews on At the Movies. Mankiewicz saluted Daryl Sabara's performance as exceptionally well done, commented on the film's "remarkably funny script", and overall considered it a "little gem". 

Roger Ebert of the Chicago Sun-Times gave World's Greatest Dad three out of four stars, but noticed that the material could have been even darker in its satire, and he questioned whether it was the director's intention.

Home media
The DVD was released on December 8, 2009, and featured an audio commentary track with the director, deleted scenes, outtakes, and a making of featurette.

See also
 A Million Little Pieces — a literary hoax popularized on a television talk show
 "Guts" — a short story which also involves death by autoerotic asphyxiation being disguised as suicide
 Dear Evan Hansen — a musical with similar story elements, including out-of-control social response from the semi-fabricated circumstances of a teenager's death

References

External links
 
 
 
 

2009 films
2009 comedy-drama films
American comedy-drama films
American black comedy films
American satirical films
Films about suicide
Films directed by Bobcat Goldthwait
Films with screenplays by Bobcat Goldthwait
Ghostwriting in fiction
Films about educators
Films about writers
Films about depression
Films set in California
Films set in schools
Films shot in Washington (state)
Films shot in Seattle
Films about father–son relationships
2000s English-language films
2000s American films